Mount Peter is a  mountain located in the New York – New Jersey Highlands, Bellvale Mountain, in the U.S. state of New York.

The mountain is named after an early pioneer to the area, Peter Conklin. A hawkwatch tower occupies a summit just north of Mount Peter; below the tower the Bellvale Farms Creamery serves hikers and passing motorists. A small ski area occupies the northward-facing slope of the mountain.

Ski Area
Mount Peter is also home to a ski and tubing area of the same name. Originally opened in 1936 as a showcase for Macy's ski apparel, the ski area occupies the mountains northern slope and features 14 trails 1 terrain park served by 1 quad chair lift, 2 double chair lifts, and 2 carpet lifts. The mountain continues operations today as the oldest operating ski area in New York and one of the only family run slopes in the region. The resort also features a full base lodge complete with cafeteria, bar and rental facilities along with a gift shop. The mountain is lighted for night skiing and tubing and features snowmaking on all trails.

References

Peter
Peter
Ski areas and resorts in New York (state)
Warwick, New York
Peter